The 1935–36 FA Cup was the 61st season of the world's oldest football cup competition, the Football Association Challenge Cup, commonly known as the FA Cup. Arsenal won the competition for the second time, beating Sheffield United 1–0 in the final at Wembley, through a late goal from Ted Drake.

Matches were scheduled to be played at the stadium of the team named first on the date specified for each round, which was always a Saturday. Some matches, however, might be rescheduled for other days if there were clashes with games for other competitions or the weather was inclement. If scores were level after 90 minutes had been played, a replay would take place at the stadium of the second-named team later the same week. If the replayed match was drawn further replays would be held until a winner was determined. If scores were level after 90 minutes had been played in a replay, a 30-minute period of extra time would be played.

Calendar

First round proper
At this stage 43 clubs from the Football League Third Division North and South joined the 25 non-league clubs having come through the qualifying rounds. Stockport County, Millwall and Luton Town were given a bye to the third round. To make the number of matches up, non-league Bishop Auckland and Corinthian were given byes to this round. 34 matches were scheduled to be played on Saturday, 30 November 1935. Six were drawn and went to replays in the following midweek fixture.

Second round proper
The matches were played on Saturday, 14 December 1935. Six matches were drawn, with replays taking place in the following midweek fixture. One of these, Halifax Town against Hartlepools United, went to a second replay.

Third round proper
The 44 First and Second Division clubs entered the competition at this stage, along with Stockport County, Millwall and Luton Town. The matches were scheduled for Saturday, 11 January 1936. Twelve matches were drawn and went to replays in the following midweek fixture.

Fourth round proper
The matches were scheduled for Saturday, 25 January 1936, although four games were played at later dates. Four games were drawn and went to replays in the following midweek fixture, of which one went to a second replay.

Fifth round proper
The matches were scheduled for Saturday, 15 February 1936, except for the Chelsea–Fulham derby game, which was played four days later. There were three replays, played in the next midweek fixture.

Sixth round proper
The four quarter-final ties were scheduled to be played on Saturday, 29 February 1936. There were no replays.

Semi-finals
The semi-final matches were played on Saturday, 21 March 1936. Sheffield United and Arsenal won their matches to meet in the final at Wembley

Final

The 1936 FA Cup Final was contested by Arsenal and Sheffield United at Wembley. Arsenal won by a single goal, scored by Ted Drake.

Match details

See also
FA Cup Final Results 1872-

References
General
Official site; fixtures and results service at TheFA.com
1935-36 FA Cup at rssf.com
1935-36 FA Cup at soccerbase.com

Specific

FA Cup seasons
FA
Cup